Hurum is a surname. Notable people with the surname include:

Alf Hurum (1882–1972), Norwegian composer and painter
Hans Jørgen Hurum (1906–2001), Norwegian music critic and non-fiction writer
Helge Hurum (born 1936), Norwegian jazz musician, composer, arranger and musical director
Per Hurum (1910–1989), Norwegian sculptor